ASEAN Grand Prix is a series of international women's volleyball tournaments in Southeast Asia featuring teams from Thailand, Vietnam, Indonesia, and the Philippines.

History
Plans of a regional women's volleyball league in Southeast Asia was first conceived in 2013 when AVC secretary-general Shanrit Wongprasert of Thailand met with officials of the Larong Volleyball sa Pilipinas, the national volleyball association of the Philippines. The league was proposed to adopt a home and away format as an effort to promote women's volleyball in the region.

SportsCore Event Management and Consultancy, Inc., the Philippine-based organizer of the Philippine Super Liga, along with club leagues from Indonesia, Thailand and Vietnam, were reportedly backing such plans. By July 2015, only "finishing touches" are yet to be made which includes the mechanics and official name of the tournament.

In December 2016, it was reported that the inaugural edition of the tournament was reportedly to be named as the "Southeast Asian SuperLiga" it was planned to be held from September 14 to 17, 2017. In January 2017, the tournament's name reportedly became the ASEAN Grand Prix.

The ASEAN Grand Prix was first held in 2019. Two separate tournaments was held in Thailand and the Philippines with Thailand winning the title for both competitions.

The series returned in 2022 as the ASEAN Grand Prix Women's Volleyball Invitation with a tournament scheduled in Thailand. A men's tournament was planned to be held in Indonesia and the Philippines as well such plan did not come to fruition. Thailand defended their AGP title after sweeping the three teams at the 2022 tournament.

Results summary

Participating nations

Debut of teams

Awards

Medals summary

References

International volleyball competitions
International women's volleyball competitions
Recurring sporting events established in 2019
2019 establishments in Asia
Volleyball competitions in Asia